Leonardo de Sousa Pereira (born 3 February 1995), commonly known as Léo Ceará, is a Brazilian footballer who plays as a forward for Cerezo Osaka.

Club career
Born in Fortaleza, Ceará, Léo Ceará joined Vitória's youth setup in 2011, from São Francisco-BA. He made his first team debut on 23 January 2014, coming on as a late substitute for Alan Pinheiro in a 3–1 away win against Confiança, for the year's Copa do Nordeste.

On 12 January 2016, after being rarely used, Léo Ceará was loaned to J3 League club FC Ryukyu for the season. Upon returning, he joined Campinense also in a temporary deal in February 2017, but moved to Confiança in May to play in the Série C.

Léo Ceará's loan with Confiança was renewed for a further year on 27 December 2017, and he subsequently scored 16 goals in all competitions for the club before being recalled by Vitória in August 2018.

Léo Ceará made his Série A debut on 23 August 2018, starting in a 0–1 away loss against Flamengo. He scored his first goal in the category three days later, netting the winner in a 1–0 home success over Atlético Mineiro, and subsequently renewed his contract until 2020 on the 28th.

On 15 May 2019, after the arrival of Neto Baiano, Léo Ceará was loaned to fellow Série B side CRB until December. He returned to Vitória in January 2020 after scoring 14 league goals for CRB, being the club's top goalscorer and the third-best overall, but was demoted to the under-23 squad after failing to agree new terms over a new contract.

Léo Ceará was only included back at Vitória's main squad in August 2020.

Yokohama F. Marinos announced on 23 January 2021 that Léo Ceará will be joining the club on a full transfer pending a medical to be performed upon arrival Japan (delayed for an indefinite period due to coronavirus immigration restrictions). He was included in the Vitória squad for the last time on 26 January 2021. Ceará left the club in 2022 after two years at Yokohama F. Marinos.

On 27 December 2022, Ceará officially transferred to Cerezo Osaka for the upcoming 2023 season.

Career statistics

Club 

.

Honours

Club
Yokohama F. Marinos
 J1 League: 2022

References

External links

1995 births
Living people
Sportspeople from Fortaleza
Brazilian footballers
Association football forwards
Campeonato Brasileiro Série A players
Campeonato Brasileiro Série B players
Campeonato Brasileiro Série C players
Esporte Clube Vitória players
Yokohama F. Marinos players
Cerezo Osaka players
Campinense Clube players
Associação Desportiva Confiança players
Clube de Regatas Brasil players
J1 League players
J3 League players
FC Ryukyu players
Brazilian expatriate footballers
Brazilian expatriate sportspeople in Japan
Expatriate footballers in Japan